Goodale Glacier is a glacier which flows north from Mount Goodale and Mount Armstrong along the west side of the Medina Peaks, in the foothills of the Queen Maud Mountains of Antarctica. It was first seen and mapped by the Byrd Antarctic Expedition, 1928–30, and was named by the Advisory Committee on Antarctic Names in association with Mount Goodale.

References

Glaciers of Amundsen Coast